The Frankfurt Homosexual Trials were a series of criminal trials in Frankfurt that took place during 1950 and 1951. Criminal proceedings were initiated against over 200 people during the trials, which began a wave of persecution against homosexuals in Germany. The trials marked the end of the relative restraint exercised by the judiciary in criminalizing homosexuality after the end of the Second World War.

Background

The gay community in Frankfurt 
With the seizure of power by the Nazi party, a massive persecution of gay men began, which led to the visible gay scene in Frankfurt disappearing completely. It was rebuilt after the end of the Second World War. Well-known meeting places included the glamorous Kleist Casino at Freßgass 6 and the Felsenkeller in Luginsland 1. The Felsenkeller had a license that allowed men to dance together there. The first association of homosexuals, the "Association for Humanitarian Lifestyle" (VhL), had its seat in the Felsenkeller. Although these activities were criminal offenses under applicable laws, the police initially tolerated them to a large extent. This led many people in Frankfurt's gay community to believe that the relevant criminal provisions were no longer applicable.

Legal background 

In 1950, Paragraph 175, a provision in the German criminal code which criminalized homosexuality, was still in effect. The code had remained unchanged since it was amended to be more severe in 1935. At that time the Nazi party tightened § 175, so that the criminal offense was extended to all "lewd" acts, which in extreme cases could also be extended to eye contact between men . Section 175a of the Criminal Code, also newly inserted in 1935, which stipulated that it could incur a sentence of up to 10 years.

After the war, the Allied Control Council suspended a number of Nazi-era laws and legislative changes. The regulations of § 175 and 175a remained in force and were incorporated into the Federal German Criminal Code in 1949. In a general clause, the Control Council had decreed that any amendment of criminal law made by the National Socialists should be checked on a case-by-case basis to determine whether they conformed to the rule of law. This also applied to Section 175a of the Criminal Code.

Investigations 
The wave of persecution in Frankfurt was triggered by the 17-year-old prostitute Otto Blankenstein, who was arrested on July 16, 1950 in Frankfurt for "commercial same-sex prostitution" and against whom the investigation was opened. The investigating Public Prosecutor, Dr. Fritz Thiede, personally took over the management of the police investigations. Under interrogation, Blankenstein named 70 clients with whom he claimed to have had 200 sexual contacts. He became a key witness, which was inadmissible under the German Criminal Procedure Law at the time. He was such an important source of information for the police and the public prosecutor that he was placed in special custody and not remanded to prison. Blankenstein either remained in the police prison or he was imprisoned in the Preungesheim correctional facility. The presentation to the Detention Judge was also omitted. At times during the investigation, Blankenstein was questioned daily. Thiede temporarily relocated his office to the Police Headquarters. The public prosecutor's office justified its considerable investigative effort vis-à-vis the public with the protection of minors and later with blackmail. The latter is considered to have been a definite pretext, as it was never mentioned as the reason for arrest.

The men named by Blankenstein were summoned, treated and also photographed. The photos were shown to other prostitutes. This resulted in 173 investigations against 214 people, of whom around 50 were arrested, many of them minors. This resulted in 42 indictments. The investigations initiated by Blankenstein's statements were joined by others, so that Thiede finally conducted 240 investigations into a total of 280 people for violations of Section 175 of the Criminal Code. Over the course of the investigation, 100 people were arrested and 75 charges were brought against them by the end of the year. Recent research has supported these figures, reconstructed by Dieter Schiefelbein.

The criminal trials

The trials in autumn 1950 
The first trial opened on October 23, 1950. On October 1, 1950, a new version of the  had come into force. The Courts Constitution Act provides the framework for which a judge is responsible for a process. The new version of the law was announced on September 12, 1950, in the Bundesgesetzblatt.

Judge Dr. Kurt Ronimi was known for prosecuting cases of violations of Paragraph 175 of the Criminal Code during the Nazi era, and had convicted around 400 men under the legal code. This violated the principle of the "Statuory Judge" according to the Article 101, Paragraph 1, Clause 2 of the Basic Law. This argument was also taken up by contemporary press reports, but not the judiciary.

The local press, especially the Frankfurter Neue Presse and the Frankfurter Rundschau, reported extensively on the trials. The reporting was initially approving of the law enforcement authorities, which affected the opinion of the readership. The publication of a reader survey resulted in broad approval of Paragraph 175 and the convictions. Due to the clear evidence, the trials ended with convictions in almost all cases.

Changed public discussion 
As the number of trials increased, public opinion turned. It became clear that Blankenstein was acting as a key witness. Key witnesses were not permitted under contemporary laws and the public reacted negatively to this development. The personality of Blankenstein and thus his credibility as a witness was also increasingly questioned. As a result of these discussions, the first appeal proceedings were initiated. In one case, the defense succeeded in enforcing a psychological report on Blankenstein in the proceedings before the Frankfurt Higher Regional Court. Thus, Blankenstein refused to testify and the process ended with an acquittal.

The trials had by then attracted nationwide attention. The press, in particular Der Spiegel and the Frankfurter Rundschau, were generally skeptical about the purpose of and motivation for the trials. Roger Nash Baldwin, one of the co-founders of the American Civil Liberties Union, said that it was "incomprehensible that such proceedings against innocent adults in the 20th century are still possible", and complained directly to the Federal Ministry of the Interior, which said it was not responsible.

The lawyer Erich Schmidt-Leichner brought about a decisive turning point in the series of trials. As the criminal defense lawyer for a homeless man accused of same-sex prostitution with minors, he pursued a strategy in his main hearing on November 8, 1950: By the lawyer now the legality of the order of the Frankfurt district court president he arranged for the hearing against his client to be adjourned. According to  the order only the judge Kurt Ronimi was instructed with the 150 at that time court hearings under §§ 175, 175a. As a result, Schmidt-Leichner, together with the court reporter Rudolf Eims, launched this accusation directed at the Frankfurt judiciary into the press. Presumably, the two men knew each other from meetings of the homophile association for humanitarian lifestyle (VhL) in the Frankfurt bar Felsenkeller, whose first chairman was the homosexual activist Heinz Meininger and whose honorary chairman Hermann Weber held. At the end of December 1950, an anonymous threatening letter was delivered to the chief public prosecutor, Hans-Krafft Kosterlitz. As a result, the public prosecutor's office suspected Schmidt-Leichner of having written the murder threat, since they apparently attributed the defense lawyer to circles of the homophile movement. However, the investigation was eventually dropped due to lack of evidence. The drastic choice of words in the threatening letter, the author of which may have been “connected with the circle of lawyers and journalists fighting legally and in public” shows “how repressive the investigative pressure exerted in the Main metropolis was perceived by those affected.” According to Speier, the manifesto became the "desperate-aggressive[...] radicalism and bitterness" of those affected by the persecution: 

"I would also like to draw your attention to the fact that a connection has been formed among those who have been persecuted by Kosterlitz and their families with the aim of getting rid of this man if the persecutions that have been going on for months are not stopped. This is not an act of cheap revenge, but an act of self-defense by people who were driven to a degree of despair by K[osterlitz] that does not let them shy away from the consequences of such an act. The elimination of a sadist who has killed no fewer than 6 people is not murder but a necessity and an obligation to those he continues to threaten. You don't let rabid dogs run around—you beat them to death! Perhaps such an act of self-defense will finally prompt the Bonn bureaucracy to consider whether a public prosecutor should be allowed to carry out private manhunts 6 years after Hitler's downfall on the basis of National Socialist criminal provisions, which can only be paralleled in the persecution of Jews in the past epoch find."

The threatening letter addressed to Kosterlitz was not only sent to the Federal President Theodor Heuss, but also leaked to the Frankfurter Rundschau and the Frankfurter Neue Presse. Although the Frankfurter Neue Presse, for example, categorized the actions of the anonymous threatening letter writer as unacceptable, they gave a broad description of the content of the letter and advocated treating the persecuted homosexuals with sympathy and developing an understanding of their powerlessness before the Frankfurt courts. The motives of the writer of the threatening letter were thus outlined as easily understandable. Last but not least, the pressure to justify that the public prosecutor's office and the court were under in relation to politicians and the public seems to have increased steadily at the turn of the year 1950/51.

In early 1951, Ronimi was promoted to the Landgericht Hanau. There he immediately made further sentences according to Paragraph 175. His successor in Frankfurt, Dr. Brückner, dissolved the chamber's special jurisdiction constructed by Ronimi, and had public prosecutor Thiede cede 60 investigations to colleagues and discontinue 60 more - a high number that made "Thiede's zeal appear even more sinister". In Frankfurt, the wave of persecution came to an end.

Trial of Blankenstein 
The trial of Blankenstein took place on February 15, 1951. The public prosecutor's office and the court did their best to prove that an unlawful leniency agreement had not been made. Since Ronimi and Thiede were largely eliminated from the event, their possible agreements with Blankenstein no longer protected the former key witness. Blankenstein was sentenced to two and a half years' youth penalty, which was quite high. Out of seven months spent in pre-trial detention, only four were credited to him as time served.

Consequences and reactions 
The Frankfurt Homosexual Trials in the Adenauer era marked a turning point that ended the relatively lax enforcement after the Second World War, and began a period of more intense persecution of homosexuals in Germany. Omar G. Encarnación, a Professor of Political Studies at Bard College, called the trials "the most vicious episode of gay persecution in postwar Europe."

A total of six of the persecuted men committed suicide: a 19-year-old jumped from the Goethe Tower, a dental technician and his friend poisoned themselves with illuminating gas. However, current research assumes only two suicides were related to the trials. Many of the accused were harmed professionally or socially. Others fled abroad. 

The psychiatrist Reinhard Redhardt examined some of the individuals involved in the trials and prepared a study about it. This is accompanied by an appendix, which contains biographical sketches for some of the examined.

The trials were the inspiration for the play The Right to Self by Rolf Italiaander, which premiered on April 2, 1952 at the Hamburg Kammerspiele. The play's premiere marked the first time after the Second World War that homosexuality was discussed on a German stage.

In 1994, the Frankfurter Engel memorial was installed in the vicinity of the Frankfurt courthouse, to commemorate those persecuted under anti-homosexual legislation.

Literature

Sources 
 Elmar Kraushaar: Unzucht vor Gericht. In: Elmar Kraushaar (Hrsg.): Hundert Jahre schwul. Eine Revue. Berlin 1997. ISBN 3 87134 307 2, p. 60–69.
 Reinhard Redhardt: Zur gleichgeschlechtlichen männlichen Prostitution. In: Studien zur Homosexualität = Beiträge zur Sexualforschung 5 (1954), p. 22–72.
 Dieter Schiefelbein: Wiederbeginn der juristischen Verfolgung homosexueller Männer in der Bundesrepublik Deutschland. Die Homosexuellen-Prozesse in Frankfurt am Main 1950/51. In: Zeitschrift für Sexualforschung 5/1 (1992), p. 59–73.
 Daniel Speier: Die Frankfurter Homosexuellenprozesse zu Beginn der Ära Adenauer – eine chronologische Darstellung. In: Mitteilungen der Magnus-Hirschfeld-Gesellschaft 61/62 (2018), p. 47–72.
 Marcus Velke: Verfolgung und Diskriminierung – Männliche Homosexualität. In: Kirsten Plötz und Marcus Velke: Aufarbeitung von Verfolgung und Repression lesbischer und schwuler Lebensweisen in Hessen 1945–1985. Bericht im Auftrag des Hessischen Ministeriums für Soziales und Integration zum Projekt „Aufarbeitung der Schicksale der Opfer des ehemaligen § 175 StGB in Hessen im Zeitraum 1945 bis 1985" (2018), p. 134–265, 275–276. [URL: https://soziales.hessen.de/sites/default/files/media/hsm/forschungsbericht_aufarbeitung_verfolgung.pdf].

Further reading 
 H. T. Riethausen: Judasengel. Frankfurt 2016.

Documentary film 
Das Ende des Schweigens by Van-Tien Hoang.

References

External links 
 Homepage: Mahnmal Homosexuellenverfolgung.
 Homepage: Queer.de.
 Homepage: Aids-Hilfe Frankfurt.
 Homepage: Frankfurter Rundschau.
 Homepage: Judasengel/ H.T. Riethausen
 Homepage: Gay Nazi victim dies without state compensation

 Homepage: Film about Frankfurt homosexual trials: A hunt that plunged hundreds of men into misery | hessenschau.de

LGBT history in Germany
History of Frankfurt
1950 in Germany
1951 in Germany
1950 in law
Persecution of LGBT people in Germany
1951 in law